Bisceglie Cathedral is a Roman Catholic cathedral in Bisceglie, Apulia, Italy. Peter II of Trani began to build the cathedral in 1073, which he dedicated to his namesake, Saint Peter. Building was completed in 1295. Formerly the episcopal seat of the Diocese of Bisceglie, it has been since 1986 a co-cathedral in the Archdiocese of Trani-Barletta-Bisceglie.

References

Roman Catholic cathedrals in Italy
Cathedrals in Apulia
Churches in the province of Barletta-Andria-Trani
Minor basilicas in Apulia